DXJL (103.3 FM), broadcasting as The New J 103.3, is a radio station owned by Sarraga Integrated and Management Corporation (SIAM) and operated by the Far East Broadcasting Company. The station's studio and transmitter are located at Unit 210, 2nd Floor CKY Center, Capistrano-T.Chaves Sts., Cagayan de Oro. It is the first & only Christian FM Station in the city.

On July 1, 2016, FEBC took over the station's operations, becoming part of the FEBC family.

References

Christian radio stations in the Philippines
Radio stations in Cagayan de Oro
Radio stations established in 2006
2006 establishments in the Philippines
Far East Broadcasting Company